Padma Shri Award, India's fourth highest civilian honours - Winners in the field of Sports:

References

Lists of Indian award winners